Obaala (or in Yoruba orthography Ọbaálá) is a senior title in the royal council of many kingdoms of the Central Yoruba subgroups, namely: the Igbomina, Ijẹṣa and Ekiti sub-ethnics.

The Ọbaálá is often designated as the automatic regent on the demise of any reigning king or paramount king.

The most famous Ọbaálá in recent Yoruba history is easily Ogedengbe, the Ijẹṣa war commander who co-led the "Ekiti Parapọ", a clan confederation which stood to oppose the imperialism of 19th century Ibadan.

Yoruba culture
Yoruba royal titles